Jonathan A.C. Sterne is a British statistician, NIHR Senior Investigator, Professor of Medical Statistics and Epidemiology, and the former Head of School of Social and Community Medicine at the  University of Bristol. He is co-author of “Essential Medical Statistics”, which received Highly Commended honors in the 2004 BMA Medical Book Competition.

Work
Sterne has been identified by Clarivate Analytics as the a "Highly Cited Researcher" in each of the last three years, as demonstrated by his production of multiple highly cited papers that rank in the top 1% by citations for field and year in Web of Science. He has a longstanding interest in methodology for systematic reviews and meta-analyses, the clinical epidemiology of HIV and AIDS in the era of antiretroviral therapy, causal inference, methodology for epidemiology and health services research, and epidemiology of asthma and allergic diseases. He has been leading the development of the ROBINS-I tool for assessing risk of bias in non-randomized studies of interventions and the development of the Cochrane Risk of Bias (RoB) tool for randomized trials. He is also leading a large collaboration of HIV cohort studies that has led to advances in our understanding of prognosis of HIV positive people. In addition, he has written a number of meta-analysis software routines used by students and researchers around the world.

On 28 August 2019 Sterne, along with Julian Higgins and colleagues, published in The British Medical Journal the RoB 2 tool, an updated version of the most widely used tool for assessing risk of bias in randomized trials included in systematic reviews.

Education
Sterne completed his undergraduate studies in mathematics at the University of Oxford. He holds an MSc and PhD in statistics from the University College London.

References

British statisticians
Academics of the University of Bristol
Alumni of the University of Oxford
Alumni of University College London
Living people
Year of birth missing (living people)
NIHR Senior Investigators